Home National Bank is a historic bank building located near Lexington, Lexington County, South Carolina. It was built in 1912, and is a two-story brick building.  Its corner entrance features a pediment supported by engaged Doric order columns.  It is one of five commercial buildings that survived the 1916 fire.  The building housed the town's post office from 1912 until the 1960s.

It was listed on the National Register of Historic Places in 1983.

References

Bank buildings on the National Register of Historic Places in South Carolina
Commercial buildings completed in 1912
Buildings and structures in Lexington County, South Carolina
National Register of Historic Places in Lexington County, South Carolina
1912 establishments in South Carolina